Gary Rowell (born 6 June 1957) is an English former footballer—most notably with Sunderland—and a current local (North East) newspaper columnist.

Born in Sunderland and raised in Seaham, h.e left school and joined Sunderland as an apprentice in 1972. His career was split (1972–84) between playing as a striker (albeit often coming from deep) and in midfield. He scored 102 goals for The Rokerites in all competitions, surpassing the previous record post-war goalscorer, Len Shackleton, who had scored 101 goals. Rowell's record stood until it in turn was beaten by Kevin Phillips in the early 21st century.

Gary was a talented player who many supporters felt was destined to become 'fully' capped by England. Unfortunately, his career was severely disrupted by a serious knee injury that he sustained during a game against Leyton Orient (in which he had already scored the winning goal) during March 1979. Following a lengthy recovery, Rowell continued to score goals in the First Division at a healthy strike-rate, but he always looked likely to struggle to maintain full fitness for the whole of any season.

Sunderland manager Len Ashurst forced Rowell out of Roker Park as part of a huge rebuilding plan in 1984, part of the slide which would ultimately take them to the third tier of English football for the first time in the club's history. Rowell moved to Norwich City, but never recreated his goalscoring exploits because of a knee injury he picked up on his first pre season tour with the Canaries. The injury would ultimately blight the rest of his career, although he did go on to play for Middlesbrough, Brighton & Hove Albion and Carlisle United before finishing his career with Burnley.

Rowell is remembered by Sunderland supporters for scoring a hat-trick for Sunderland in a 4–1 win away at local rivals Newcastle United on 24 February 1979. Describing the match later, he said "When we hit the 4th I had a chat with Kevin Arnott about whether to try for a fifth or just to take the piss. We decided to take the piss."

He now works as a radio summariser on Real Radio, commentating on all Sunderland games. He previously spent seven years covering Sunderland's games on Metro Radio and Magic 1152.

In 2005, he was voted Sunderland's all-time cult hero on the television programme Football Focus, whilst in 2006, Sunderland fanzine A Love Supreme voted him their Best Player of the 1980s. Such accolades reflect his almost 'iconic' status on Wearside, which has led him to recently be inducted in to the Sunderland A.F.C hall of fame.

External links

Gary Rowell Column - Sunderland Echo
Gary Rowell featured at sporting-heroes.net - Sunderland AFC
Career information at safc.com
Career information at ex-canaries.co.uk
https://web.archive.org/web/20080902150721/http://www.sunderlandecho.com/sectionhome.aspx?sectionID=5849

References & notes

1957 births
Living people
English footballers
England under-21 international footballers
Association football forwards
Association football midfielders
Sunderland A.F.C. players
Norwich City F.C. players
Middlesbrough F.C. players
Brighton & Hove Albion F.C. players
Carlisle United F.C. players
Burnley F.C. players
Dundee F.C. players
English Football League players
Scottish Football League players
Sportspeople from Seaham
Footballers from County Durham